The Peshtera Hydro Power Plant (before 1992: Kimon Georgiev Hydro Power Plant) is an active underground hydro power plant in Peshtera, Bulgaria, part of the Batak Hydropower Cascade. It has 5 individual Pelton turbines which can deliver up to 128 MW of power.

References

Hydroelectric power stations in Bulgaria
Buildings and structures in Pazardzhik Province